Shane R. Jimerson is a professor of Counseling, Clinical, and School Psychology in the Gevirtz Graduate School of Education at the University of California, Santa Barbara.

Education and academic career 
Jimerson earned a B.A. in psychology with a minor in education from the University of California, Berkeley in 1992. He earned an M.A. in Child Development in 1994 and doctoral degrees in school psychology and child development in 1997 from the University of Minnesota, Minneapolis.

Publications 
He is the author of over 400 publications.

Curriculum 
In collaboration with other school-psychology researchers and a filmmaker Jimerson created the Promoting Positive Peer Relationships Bullying-Prevention Program, which includes curricula for the classroom, professional development and parent and community outreach.

Boards and committees 
President of the Society for the Study of School Psychology (2019-2021, elect, president, past)
President of the International School Psychology Association (2013-2018, elect, president, past)
President, Division 16 (School Psychology), American Psychological Association (2012) 
Vice-president for Convention Affairs and Public Relations, Division 16 (School Psychology), American Psychological Association (2008–2010)
President-elect, International School Psychology Association
Chair, Research Committee, International School Psychology Association (2000–present) 
Chair, Division 16 (School Psychology) conference proceedings, 2005 American Psychological Association Conference
Chair, 2005 Division 16 Lightner Witmer Award Committee
Chair, School Psychology Research Collaboration Conference (2003 and 2005)

Books 
Mayer, M. J. & Jimerson, S. R. (2019). School Safety and Violence Prevention: Science, Practice, and Policy. Washington DC: American Psychological Association.
Brown, J. A. & Jimerson, S. R. (2017). Supporting Bereaved Students at School. Oxford, UK: Oxford University Press.
Brock, S. E., Nickerson, A. B., Reeves, M. A. L., Conolly-Wilson, C., Jimerson, S. R., Pesce, R. C., & Lazzaro, B. (2016). School crisis prevention and intervention: The PREPaRE model (2nd ed.). Bethesda, MD: National Association of School Psychologists.
Jimerson, S. R., Burns, M. K, & VanDerHeyden, A. M. (Eds) (2016). The Handbook of Response to Intervention: Science and Practice of Multi Tiered Systems of Support 2nd Edition. New York: Springer Science. 
Hart, S., Brock, S. E., & Jeltova, H. (2013).  Identifying, Assessing, and Treating Bipolar Disorder at School.  New York: Springer Science. In the Developmental Psychopathology at School book series, Edited by Shane Jimerson and Stephen Brock
Jimerson, S. R., Oakland, T. D., & Farrell, P. T. (Eds) (2013). 世界の学校心理学事典 (The Handbook of International School Psychology). Tokyo: Akashi Shoten.
 Jimerson, S. R., Nickerson, A. B., Mayer, M. J., & Furlong, M. J. (Eds) (2012). Handbook of School Violence and School Safety: International Research and Practice (2nd Edition). New York: Taylor and Francis.
 Brock, S. E., & Jimerson S. R. (Eds.) (2012). Best Practices in School Crisis Prevention and Intervention (2nd Edition). Bethesda, MD: National Association of School Psychologists.
 Miller, D. & Brock, S. E. (2011).  Identifying, Assessing, and Treating Self-Injury at School.  New York: Springer Science. In the Developmental Psychopathology at School book series, Edited by Shane Jimerson and Stephen Brock
 Li, H., Pearrow, M., & Jimerson, S. R. (2010).  Identifying, Assessing, and Treating Early Onset Schizophrenia at School.  New York: Springer Science. In the Developmental Psychopathology at School book series, Edited by Shane Jimerson and Stephen Brock
 Jimerson, S. R., Swearer, S. M., & Espelage, D. L. (Eds) (2010). The Handbook of Bullying in Schools: An International Perspective. New York: Routledge.
 Brock, S. E., Nickerson, A. B., Reeves, M. A., Jimerson, S. R., Lieberman, R., & Feinberg, T. (2009). School Crisis Prevention and Intervention: The PREPaRE Model.  Bethesda, MD: National Association of School Psychologists.
 Brock, S. E., Jimerson, S. R., & Hansen, R. (2009).  Identifying, Assessing, and Treating Attention Deficit Hyperactivity Disorder (ADHD) at School.  New York: Springer Science. In the Developmental Psychopathology at School book series, Edited by Shane Jimerson and Stephen Brock
 Nickerson, A. B., Reeves, M. A., Brock, S. E., & Jimerson, S. R. (2009).  Identifying, Assessing, and Treating Post Traumatic Stress Disorder (PTSD) at School.  New York: Springer Science. In the Developmental Psychopathology at School book series, Edited by Shane Jimerson and Stephen Brock
 Christo, C., Davies, J., & Brock, S. E. (2009).  Identifying, Assessing, and Treating Dyslexia at School.  New York: Springer Science. In the Developmental Psychopathology at School book series, Edited by Shane Jimerson and Stephen Brock
 Hughes, T. L., Crothers, L. M., & Jimerson, S. R. (2008). Identifying, Assessing, and Treating Conduct Disorder at School. New York: Springer Science. In the Developmental Psychopathology at School book series, Edited by Shane Jimerson and Stephen Brock
 Jimerson, S. R., Burns, M. K, & VanDerHeyden, A. M. (Eds) (2007). Handbook of Response to Intervention: The Science and Practice of Assessment and Intervention. New York: Springer Science.
 Jimerson, S. R., Oakland, T. D., & Farrell, P. T. (Eds) (2007). The Handbook of International School Psychology. London: SAGE.
 Jimerson, S. R., & Furlong, M. J. (Eds) (2006). Handbook of School Violence and School Safety: From Research to Practice. Mahwah, New Jersey. Lawrence Erlbaum Associates, Inc.
 Brock, S. E., Jimerson, S., & Hansen, R. (2006).  Identifying, Assessing, and Treating Autism at School.  New York: Springer Science.
 Brock, S. E., Lazarus, P. J., & Jimerson S. R. (Eds.) (2002). Best Practices in School Crisis Prevention and Intervention. Bethesda, MD: National Association of School Psychologists.
 Lehmann, L., Jimerson, S., & Gaasch, A. (2001).  The mourning child grief support group curriculum: Teens together version.  Philadelphia, PA:  Brunner & Routledge.
 Lehmann, L., Jimerson, S., & Gaasch, A. (2001).  The mourning child grief support group curriculum: Middle childhood version.  Philadelphia, PA:  Brunner & Routledge.
 Lehmann, L., Jimerson, S., & Gaasch, A. (2001).  The mourning child grief support group curriculum: Early childhood version.  Philadelphia, PA:  Brunner & Routledge.
 Lehmann, L., Jimerson, S., & Gaasch, A. (2001).  The mourning child grief support group curriculum: Denny the Duck preschool version.  Philadelphia, PA:  Brunner & Routledge.
 Lehmann, L., Jimerson, S., & Gaasch, A. (2001).  Grief support group curriculum facilitators handbook.  Philadelphia, PA:  Brunner & Routledge.

References

21st-century American psychologists
Living people
University of California, Berkeley alumni
University of California, Santa Barbara faculty
University of Minnesota College of Education and Human Development alumni
University of Minnesota Medical School alumni
Fellows of the American Psychological Association
Year of birth missing (living people)